Bouldin Creek is a neighborhood in Austin, Texas, originally created at the turn of the 20th century. It has several homes remaining from that era and more from the 1920s and 1930s.

 
Bouldin Creek is bordered by South Congress to the east, the Union Pacific railroad track to the west, Barton Springs to the north, and West Oltorf to the south. It includes two major commercial areas, South First and South Congress.

The neighborhood has the Victorian mansion Green Pastures, which once belonged to Austinite John Henry Faulk, and the St. Anne African Methodist Episcopal Church (originally constructed in 1916) on Newton Street. The neighbourhood also contains the Texas School for the Deaf.

The Bouldin Creek Neighborhood Association arbitrates development and city initiatives with the neighborhood's residents.

Neighborhoods in Austin, Texas